Emiliotia immaculata is a species of small sea snail with calcareous opercula, a marine gastropod mollusk in the family Colloniidae.

Distribution
This species occurs in the Caribbean Sea off Cuba.

References

External links
 To Encyclopedia of Life
 To World Register of Marine Species

Colloniidae
Gastropods described in 2008